Leah Thomas (born May 30, 1989) is an American professional racing cyclist who currently rides for UCI Women's WorldTeam .

Early life 
Thomas grew up as a competitive gymnast in the Bay Area. She competed in Central Coast Section for Monta Vista High School

Thomas graduated from Monta Vista High School in 2007 and from Northwestern University in 2011. She began running during her time at Northwestern, but due to injury, she was forced to stop. She began cycling shortly thereafter. In 2013 she moved to northeastern Arizona to teach, and she began to delve deeper into cycling there. She moved back to the Bay Area in 2014 to ride and live with her parents.

Major results

2016
 4th Overall Cascade Cycling Classic
 5th Overall Tour of California
1st Stage 2 (TTT)

2017
 2nd Winston Salem Cycling Classic
 3rd Overall Tour Cycliste Féminin International de l'Ardèche
1st  Combination classification 
 3rd Overall Tour of the Gila
1st Stage 3 (ITT)
 National Road Championships
3rd Road race
3rd Time trial
 4th Overall Tour de Feminin-O cenu Českého Švýcarska
 5th Chrono Gatineau

2018
 1st  Overall Tour de Feminin-O cenu Českého Švýcarska
 1st Chrono Champenois - Trophée Européen
 1st Stage 1 (ITT) Valley of the Sun
 3rd Overall Tour of the Gila
 3rd Overall Joe Martin Stage Race
 5th Time trial, UCI Road World Championships
 8th Overall Tour of California

2019
 1st  Time trial, Pan American Road Championships
 1st  Overall Women's Tour of Scotland
1st  Points classification 
1st Stage 3 
 1st Chrono des Nations

2021 
 1st  Overall Tour Cycliste Féminin International de l'Ardèche
1st  Points classification
1st Stage 2
 3rd Time trial, National Road Championships
 4th Brabantse Pijl

See also
List of 2018 UCI Women's Teams and riders

References

External links
 
 Leah Thomas's Strava Profile

1989 births
Living people
American female cyclists
Place of birth missing (living people)
Olympic cyclists of the United States
Cyclists at the 2020 Summer Olympics
21st-century American women
Cyclists from California
Sportspeople from Santa Clara, California